Edith Pikwa Boma (born January 3) is a Cameroonian actress, resident in Houston, Texas, United States.

Career
She was nominated in the Best Actress /Most Promising Actress – Diaspora award category for the film, A Message to Brian, in which she was starred, in the 2014 Golden Icons Academy Movie Awards (GIAMA) Awards. The film was premiered in Houston, Texas.

She was starred in the film, Ndolor and the Senator, which premiered on January 31, 2016, in Houston, Texas. The film produced by Mbango Adambi and directed by Gordon Che featured both Callywood and Nollywood actors and actresses like Mbango Adambi, Kelechi Eke, Frank Artus, Sunnyfield Okezie, Jasmine Roland, Eko Leonel, Ruth Taku, Bareh Mildred, Samson Tarh and Beatrice Nwana.

Her film, Kiss of Death, was the opening film at the CAMIFF 2017 event on April 24.

She was a lead actress in the Camerwood 2018 film, Tenacity, also featuring Libota McDonald, Mat Atugon, Vugah Samson and Eyo Eyo Michael. The film also won the Best Feature Film award at the 2018 CAMIFF Awards.

Filmography

References

External links
 Edith Pikwa Boma on IMDb
 Edith Pikwa on Who is Who in Cameroon

Cameroonian actresses
Living people
Year of birth missing (living people)